Colin McMaster is a New Zealand former rugby league footballer who represented New Zealand in the 1968 World Cup.

Playing career
A West Coast representative, McMaster played for the South Island against South Africa in 1963, winning 12-8.

In 1968 he was selected for the New Zealand national rugby league team and played in one match at the World Cup that year.

References

Living people
New Zealand rugby league players
New Zealand national rugby league team players
West Coast rugby league team players
South Island rugby league team players
Rugby league props
Rugby league second-rows
Year of birth missing (living people)